Dermot Curtis (26 August 1932 – 1 November 2008) was an Irish international footballer. He represented his country 17 times, playing at centre-forward.

Curtis was playing in the League of Ireland for Shelbourne when he first hit the headlines. On 19 September, at Dalymount Park the League of Ireland XI held a star-studded English League XI to a 3–3 draw with Curtis notching the vital third goal.

He made his full international debut for Republic of Ireland at home to Denmark on 3 October 1956 in which he scored. In December that year he joined Bristol City for £8,000 where he was to score 16 league goals in only 26 games.  In September 1958 he joined Ipswich Town, playing in the side that won promotion to Division One in 1961, and the league championship the following season. However, the form of Ray Crawford and Ted Phillips limited his chances at Portman Road, and in August 1963 he moved to Exeter City after only 41 league games (in which he scored 17 times).

On 23 September 1963 he became the first Exeter player to be capped for his country as he earned his 17th and final international cap in a 0–0 draw with Austria in Vienna. After 91 league appearances (in which he scored 23 goals), Curtis moved to Torquay United, signing in August 1966. However, his move to Plainmoor was not a great success as in his only season he made just 12 league appearances, scoring just a single goal. In June 1967 he returned to Exeter City, where his league career was to end after a further 66 league appearances in which he scored 10 goals. He later played non-league football for Bideford.

Curtis died in Exeter on 1 November 2008, after a long illness.

Honours
 League of Ireland
 Shelbourne F.C. 1952–53
 Football League Second Division
 Ipswich Town F.C. 1960–61
 Football League First Division
 Ipswich Town F.C. 1961–62

References

1932 births
2008 deaths
Association footballers from Dublin (city)
Republic of Ireland association footballers
Republic of Ireland international footballers
League of Ireland players
Shelbourne F.C. players
Bristol City F.C. players
Ipswich Town F.C. players
Exeter City F.C. players
Torquay United F.C. players
Bideford A.F.C. players
League of Ireland XI players
English Football League players
Association football forwards